Autumn Cheyenne Durald Arkapaw (born December 14, 1979) is an American cinematographer.

Biography
Durald grew up in the San Francisco Bay Area. She attended Loyola Marymount University and studied art history. After graduating she worked in advertising and later as a camera assistant on films. She graduated from the AFI Conservatory's cinematography program in 2009. In 2022, she became a member of the American Society of Cinematographers.

Durald is married to Australian cinematographer Adam Arkapaw; the couple has one son, Aedan.

Filmography

Films

Other credits

Television

Music videos
 Rihanna "Lift Me Up" (2022) (also director)
SZA, The Weeknd, Travis Scott "Power Is Power" (2019)
Jonas Brothers  "Sucker" (2019)
 The Arcade Fire "Afterlife (live)" (2014)
 Solange Knowles "Lovers in the Parking Lot" (2013)
 London Grammar "Strong" (2013)
 Haim "Falling" (2013)
 Haim "Desert Days" (2013)
 Janelle Monáe "Primetime" (2013)

Awards

In 2014, Variety named her as one of ten "Cinematographers to Watch".
In 2014, Variety named her as one of the "Up Next" in their Below The Line Impact Report.
In 2014, Indiewire named her as one of the "On The Rise: Cinematographers To Watch".

References

External links

1979 births
Living people
21st-century American women
AFI Conservatory alumni
American cinematographers
American women cinematographers
Film people from California
Loyola Marymount University alumni
People from Oxnard, California